Sabari Karthik (born 30 March 1990) is an Indian karate player. He represents India in various Karate tournaments, across the globe. Notable participation being 16th 2010 Asian Games held in China, the Malaysian Open (silver medal) and the first South Asian championship held in Delhi.

Early life 
Sabari Karthik was born on 30 March 1990, in Coimbatore, India. to Gunasekaran and Geetha Kumari.  His father was a policeman who died when Sabari was 11 years old. He did his School education in Coimbatore. Sabari started training in Zen martial arts academy by Coach Sensei N. Karthikeyan. He has won awards at District, State and National levels, before he earned his first international outing in Philippines in 2005 at 15 and World Karate Championship in 2007 
Being in the Indian national team he got trained under coaches from Iran and Spain and Malaysia.

Achievements 

Sabari Karthik won his first international gold medal in the International Junior Karate Championship, held in Singapore, 4 July 2009. He then went on to Clinch a silver and a bronze medal in the 1st South Asian karate championship, held in Delhi. He has then won a silver medal in the Malaysian Open, held in Malaysia.

Career Statistics

References

External links
 Sabari Karthik does Coimbatore proud
 Sabari Karthik wins Gold medal in Singapore Open Karate Championships

1990 births
Living people
Indian male karateka
Karateka at the 2010 Asian Games
Indian male martial artists
Martial artists from Tamil Nadu
Asian Games competitors for India
Tamil sportspeople
21st-century Indian people